Jagdish Lal (8 October 1920 – 3 March 1997) was an Indian cricketer. He played sixteen first-class matches for eight different teams between 1938 and 1959.

See also
 List of Hyderabad cricketers

References

External links
 

1920 births
1997 deaths
Indian cricketers
East Zone cricketers
Hindus cricketers
Hyderabad cricketers
Northern India cricketers
Railways cricketers
Services cricketers
United Provinces cricketers
People from Kapurthala